The Congressional Record is the official record of the proceedings and debates of the United States Congress, published by the United States Government Publishing Office and issued when Congress is in session. The Congressional Record Index is updated daily online and published monthly. At the end of a session of Congress, the daily editions are compiled in bound volumes constituting the permanent edition. Chapter 9 of Title 44 of the United States Code authorizes publication of the Congressional Record.

The Congressional Record consists of four sections: the House section, the Senate section, the Extensions of Remarks, and, since the 1940s, the Daily Digest. At the back of each daily issue is the Daily Digest, which summarizes the day's floor and committee activities and serves as a table of contents for each issue. The House and Senate sections contain proceedings for the separate chambers of Congress.

A section of the Congressional Record titled Extensions of Remarks contains speeches, tributes and other extraneous words that were not uttered during open proceedings of the full Senate or of the full House of Representatives. Witnesses in committee hearings are often asked to submit their complete testimony "for the record" and only deliver a summary of it in person. The full statement will then appear in a printed volume of the hearing identified as "Statements for the Record". In years past, this particular section of the Congressional Record was called the "Appendix". While members of either body may insert material into Extensions of Remarks, Senators rarely do so. The overwhelming majority of what is found there is entered at the request of Members of the House of Representatives. From a legal standpoint, most materials in the Congressional Record are classified as secondary authority, as part of a statute's legislative history.

By custom and rules of each house, members also frequently "revise and extend" their remarks made on the floor before the debates are published in the Congressional Record. Therefore, for many years, speeches that were not delivered in Congress appeared in the Congressional Record, including in the sections purporting to be verbatim reports of debates. In recent years, however, these revised remarks have been preceded by a "bullet" symbol or, more recently and currently, printed in a typeface discernibly different from that used to report words spoken by members.

The Congressional Record is publicly available for records before 1875 via the Library of Congress' American Memory Century of Lawmaking website, and since 1989 via Congress.gov (which replaced the THOMAS database in 2016). Thanks to a partnership between GPO and the Library of Congress, digital versions of the bound editions are available on govinfo.gov for 1873 to 2001 (Volumes 1-147) and 2005 to 2015 (Volumes 151-161). Govinfo.gov also provides access to digital versions of the daily edition from 1994 (Volume 140) to the present.

History 
The Constitution, in Article I, Section 5, requires Congress to keep a journal of its proceedings, although the House and Senate Journals are separate publications from the Congressional Record, and include only a bare record of actions and votes, rather than verbatim texts of the debates.

The Congressional Record was first published in 1873. Prior to this, proceedings, roll calls, debates, and other records were recorded in The Annals of Congress (formerly known as The Debates and Proceedings in the Congress of the United States; 1789–1824), the Register of Debates in Congress (1824–1837), or the Congressional Globe (1833–1873). A digital collection of these historical volumes is now available online via the Library of Congress.

See also 
 Federal Register, the official daily publication for rules, proposed rules, and notices of US federal agencies and organizations
 Hansard, British parliamentary record
 United States House Journal
 United States Senate Journal

References

External links 

Search Congressional Record (starting from 1927) via congress.gov 
Congressional Record Bound Edition (from 1873) via govinfo.gov 
Congressional Record Daily Edition (from 1994) via govinfo.gov 
Congressional Record Index (from 1983) via govinfo.gov 

 Overview of the Congressional Record and Its Predecessor Publications: A Research Guide
 Sessions of Congress and Corresponding Debate Record Volume Numbers
 Find Congressional Record in a Depository Library
 Sources for the Congressional Record: Free and Commercial for people with access to libraries
 U.S. Congressional Documents and Debates, 1774-1875, containing the Annals of Congress, Register of Debates, Congressional Globe, and Congressional Record, hosted by the Library of Congress

Publications of the United States Congress
Transcripts of legislative proceedings